The dwarf fat-tailed jerboa (Pygeretmus pumilio) is a species of rodent in the family Dipodidae. It is found in China, Iran, Kazakhstan, Mongolia, and Russia. They mostly reside in desert environments which can explain their size. They go long periods of time without food and water, which means they need a lower metabolic rate, and can be a reason for their size.

References

Pygeretmus
Mammals of the Middle East
Mammals of Pakistan
Taxonomy articles created by Polbot
Mammals described in 1792